Rhabdochaeta gladifera is a species of tephritid or fruit flies in the genus Rhabdochaeta of the family Tephritidae.

Distribution
The species is commonly found in India.

References

Tephritinae
Insects described in 1941
Diptera of Asia